Away from the World is the eighth studio album by Dave Matthews Band (DMB), released on September 11, 2012. The album is their first since 2009's Big Whiskey & the GrooGrux King. The album's title comes from a line in the song "The Riff": "Sitting in a box / away from the world out there." According to Matthews, it relates to the dour idea that "we are born and die alone" and that "our body is our box."

Recording
Steve Lillywhite produced Away from the World, which marks his first released studio album with the band since 1998's Before These Crowded Streets. A series of failed sessions with Lillywhite led to the leaked Lillywhite Sessions in 2000 and Lillywhite's departure from the band's work.

DMB and Lillywhite recorded the album in a Seattle studio beginning in early January 2012, and production on the album finished in May. In addition to the 11 songs that made the album, one other song was attempted during the sessions, but the band did not complete that song. Violinist Boyd Tinsley said of the process: "Some of the songs that you hear on this album, the basic tracks came out, like, the first or second time we played them. Dave would come in with part of a song. We’d get into the control room and we’d finish it, putting in a chorus or bridge here and working out arrangements. And then we went to the studio, and we just played."

Roger Smith from Tower of Power plays Hammond Organ on "a couple of tunes" on the album.

Dave Matthews debuted the lead single "Mercy" on Late Night with Jimmy Fallon on April 24, and DMB released the studio version in July. The band also released the studio version of "Gaucho" in May. Those songs, in addition to "Sweet," "If Only," "The Riff," "Rooftop," "Snow Outside," and "Belly Belly Nice," were all performed during DMB's 2012 summer tour.

As part of the promotion in the week leading up to the release of Away From The World, iTunes streamed the complete album for free beginning on September 4, 2012.

Critical reception

The album was listed at #29 on Rolling Stones list of the top 50 albums of 2012, saying "The album's political entreaties made for some of 2012's best GOTV rock."

Commercial performance
The album debuted at No. 1 on Billboard 200 with album sales of 266,000 for the week. This was the third lowest debut sales of an album since Crash but the band's sixth straight No. 1-debuting studio album. As of December 6, 2012, the album has sold 458,000 copies.

Track listing
The track listing for the album was announced along with the album's title and release date.

All songs written by David J. Matthews except where noted.Deluxe CD Track listing"Gaucho" (Hartford, CT – 5.25.12) - 4:50
"Mercy" (Bristow, VA – 6.16.12) - 8:53
"Sweet" (Cleveland, OH – 6.3.12) - 4:43

The Super Deluxe Version includes the three live tracks featured on the Deluxe CD, as well as a Bonus CD featuring tracks from the DMB 2012 Summer Tour, and a DVD featuring live performances from the 2012 Summer Tour.Super Deluxe CD Track listing"Save Me" (Toronto, Canada - 6.2.12)
"You Never Know" (Saratoga Springs, NY - 6.8.12)
"Jimi Thing" (Atlanta, GA - 5.22.12)
"Halloween" » (Mansfield, MA - 6.6.12)
"Tripping Billies" (Mansfield, MA - 6.6.12)
"Mansfield Jam » Why I Am" (Mansfield, MA - 6.5.12)
"Time Bomb » "(St. Paul, MN - 6.24.12)
"Two Step" (St. Paul, MN - 6.24.12)

The first 5 tracks are included with every pre-order of Away From The World. The final three tracks are only available to Warehouse Fan Club members.DVD Track listing"Eh Hee" (Noblesville, IN – 6.22.12)
"Pig" (Mansfield, MA – 6.5.12)
"Say Goodbye" (Saratoga Springs, NY – 6.8.12)
"Lie In Our Graves" (Saratoga Springs, NY – 6.8.12)
"What Would You Say" (Saratoga Springs, NY – 6.8.12)
"Stay or Leave"  (Wantagh, NY – 6.12.12)
"Little Red Bird" (Hartford, CT – 5.26.12)
"Blue Water » Best of What’s Around" (E. Troy, WI – 7.6.12)
"Shotgun" (Hershey, PA – 6.29.12)
"Don’t Drink The Water" (Noblesville, IN – 6.22.12)

The DVD is only available to those who pre-ordered the Super Deluxe Edition.

PersonnelDave Matthews Band Carter Beauford – drums, percussion, background vocals
 Stefan Lessard – bass guitar, Rhodes
 Dave Matthews – guitar, piano, lead vocals
 Boyd Tinsley – violin
 Tim Reynolds - electric and acoustic guitars
 Rashawn Ross – trumpet, bass trumpet, flugelhorn, keyboards, background vocals
 Jeff Coffin – soprano saxophone, tenor saxophone, baritone saxophone, flute, alto fluteGuest musicians Roger Smith - Hammond organ 
 Youth Co-Op Choir – background vocals Production'
 Steve Lillywhite – producer, mixing 
 John Alagía – co-producer , additional recording
 Floyd Reitsma – engineer, mixing 
 Lars Fox – Pro Tools engineer
 Steven Aguilar – assistant engineer
 Michael H. Brauer – mixing
 Ryan Gilligan – mix assistant and Pro Tools engineer
 Justin Armstrong – additional engineering
 Ted Jensen – mastering

Charts

Weekly charts

Year-end charts

References

2012 albums
Albums produced by Steve Lillywhite
Dave Matthews Band albums
RCA Records albums